The year 1890 in archaeology:

Explorations
 Alfred Maudslay begins his documentation of the Maya ruins of Palenque.

Excavations
 Arthur Evans excavates a Belgae cemetery site at Aylesford.
 J.R. Mortimer begins excavations at Duggleby Howe.
 The Society of Antiquaries of London begins its excavations of Calleva Atrebatum (Silchester Roman Town).
 Merv.
 Flinders Petrie excavates at Tell el-Hesi, Palestine (mistakenly identified as Lachish), the first scientific excavation of an archaeological site in the Holy Land, during which he discovers how tells are formed.

Finds
 Saltley handaxe excavated in Birmingham, the first paleolithic human artefact found in The Midlands of England.

Births
 April 21: Benno Landsberger, German Assyriologist (d. 1968)
 September 10: Mortimer Wheeler, British archaeologist (d. 1976)

Deaths
 August 2 - Charles Roach Smith, British archaeologist; co-founder of the British Archaeological Association  (b. 1807)
 October 28: Jean Baptiste Holzmayer, German archaeologist (b. 1839)
 December 26: Heinrich Schliemann, German archaeologist, excavator of Troy (b. 1822)

References

Archaeology
Archaeology by year
Archaeology
Archaeology